HMS Swiftsure was one of three  light cruisers built for the Royal Navy during the Second World War. She was laid down by Vickers Armstrong at Newcastle upon Tyne on 22 September 1941, launched on 4 February 1943 by Lady Wake-Walker and commissioned on 22 June 1944. The first of a new Minotaur class, a development of the later Colony class with extra beam and a fifth twin 4 inch turret. Swiftsure was the last Royal Navy cruiser completed during World War II and was the first British cruiser designed around the concept of an operations room and modern radar, with sensor screens and communications positioned for efficient operation. During her service in the Pacific in 1945, she proved the most efficient anti-aircraft cruiser in the fleet and was the first Royal Navy cruiser with the Type 274 lock-and-follow radar targeting system for her main armament.

Service history

Second World War service

Swiftsure joined the Home Fleet on commissioning and in 1944 was assigned to the Eastern Fleet where, in November 1944, she became a unit of the newly formed British Pacific Fleet. In the Pacific she participated in the Okinawa Campaign of March–May 1945 and in June took part in the carrier raid on Truk. Here the British Pacific Fleet were operating as part of Task Group 111.2, with the cruisers shelling the islands. On 30 August 1945 this group re-entered Hong Kong and accepted the Japanese surrender there. Swiftsure was at this time the flagship of the British Pacific Cruiser Squadron and was selected by Admiral Cecil Harcourt to hoist his flag for the Japanese surrender.

Postwar service

In 1946 she was the flagship of the 4th Cruiser Squadron and in 1951 she became the flagship of the 2nd Cruiser Squadron.

In 1953 she took part in the Fleet Review to celebrate the Coronation of Queen Elizabeth II. On 29 September 1953, she was involved in a collision with the destroyer  leading to a fierce fire in the bridge cable trunk, which carries all the electrical cabling to the bridge, operations room, foremast and DCT. She remained inactive until beginning a major refit in February 1957 at Chatham Dockyard to bring her up largely to the standard of the later .  Six twin L70 40 mm Bofors would have been fitted, it having been planed to adopt AA guns smaller than 76mm since WW2 as soon as proximity fuses could be fitted to shells smaller than 3 inches as the higher rate of fire of the smaller shells was more effective and the existing L60 solid shell 40mm was ineffective at more than a mile range. but Swiftsure would have retained her original triple 6-inch turrets.

Midway through the conversion in August 1959, with her new bridge and lattice masts in place, the refit was cancelled. Some reports and the government statement to Parliament in 1962 say the refit was costing too much to produce an obsolete ship. Original estimates for the refit in 1956 had been 4 million pounds. The damage suffered during her earlier collision with Diamond was not fully surveyed at the time and only became apparent during the refit. The extra work delayed the modernisation and after expenditure of more than 1 million pounds, and facing far higher dockyard labour and material costs, modernisation as a gun cruiser was abandoned. In a photo from April 1960 of Swiftsure at Chatham dockyard, shows the three turrets reinstalled and the reconstruction partially complete suggesting the rebuilt hull had sufficient strength. Even with the six channel AA fire control system planned for Swiftsure (which combined 40 mm and 4-inch fire against specific targets) the twin 4-inch turrets with roof mounted tracking radar were still slow firing and obsolete compared with the  USN twin 3/50 fitted to HMS Victorious or RN twin 3-inch/70 fitting to the Tiger cruisers. The plan to fit 3/70 turrets to Swiftsure and Superb was abandoned in 1951 and the intended 40mm L/70 AA rearmament of HMS Swiftsure apppears to have been abandoned because it required a 0.5 million pound conversion to AC power and secondly because the Sandys Defence Review led to the final cancellation of ordered single and twin 40mm L70 mounts for the RN in favour of the unproven Greenlight/ Seacat missile. New little improved versions of the RN Mk 19 Twin   AA guns were fitted in RN cruiser refits through the 1950s, for the last time in HMS Bermuda in 1957 and Belfast in 1959 but were obsolete, and inaccurate compared with single Mk 5, 55 degree elevation 4.5-inch guns refitted on the Ca-class destroyers and Type 81 (Tribal) class frigates from 1955.

The refit of Swiftsure was expensively slowed, when the hull was discovered in early 1958 to have compressed more than  under the weight of a new bridge, there were many stanchions fitted internally below the new bridge to prevent further collapse of the structure, which was similar to that fitted to Belfast, and intended in both cruisers to allow the fitting of data links to the carriers and an operations room which would have included screens for the new Type 965 radar and Type 184 sonar requested by the RN staff in 1957 for Swiftsure and Superb. However the hull was rebuilt in 1958 and by early 1959 the structural reconstruction was complete but the old armament was assessed as too obsolete to fit. The option of fitting the new 3-inch twin 70 mm turrets in centreline, 'A', 'B', 'X' and 'Y' positions was possible, but converting the ship from DC power to AC for the new guns, added at least another half million pounds to the cost. Slow progress on debugging new 3-inch/70 calibre guns, which saw the aircraft carrier Victorious armed with slower firing US 3-inch/50 calibre mountings. Plans to fit the 3/70 to the Colony class and Swiftsures and Superb were abandoned by 1951. The RN ordered only 25 of the 3/70 auto AA mounts for the Tiger class, Type 41 AA frigates and 17,000 ton GWS gun and missile cruisers which were cancelled in 1957 resulting in the 3/70 stock being sold to the RCN in 1957. The USN ordered 20 3/70 AA turrets using the same ammunition as the RN/RCN mount and the USN actually fitted the gun to USS Norfolk, 4 Mitcher DDL and several Gearing Fram 1 destroyers but found the mounting so difficult they never fired the guns at all while they were installed on the USN destroyers. There only capability was that potentisl third world weapons did not realise they had zero hard capability. A storm of opposition in the press and Parliament to the rising cost and slow completion of the cruisers  and  led to the premature sale of the operational refitted cruisers HMS Ceylon and Newfoundland to Peru, the stopping  and non restarting of Swiftsures reconstruction  and an abortive attempt to commission HMS Lion for service a year earlier than scheduled thru shortcuts to the reconstruction and modernisation of its engineering rooms,  and a large order for proximity fused 40 mm L70s cancelled. To finance the immensely expensive completion of the two incomplete Tigers and nip in the bud the intense opposition to 'obsolete cruisers' and new gunnery perceived as faulty, work on Swiftsures refit stopped. Her sister ship Superb, had been paid off into reserve in late 1957 after 12 years service, her similar modernisation plans abandoned April 1957 and was sold for scrap in early 1960, one of the first Fiji or Improved Minotaurs to be scrapped. Alternative plans for converting Swiftsure to a helicopter carrier were already being considered seriously by 1958,

In November 1960 Swiftsure was still being seriously considered for retention and modernisation with Seaslug missiles as a single-ended conversion or as a helicopter carrier. The Admiralty considered Swiftsure one of its few modern and modernised cruiser hulls and even considered completely flat decking the cruiser to carry 10–12 helicopters, estimated to cost a prohibitive £7 million pounds and other more limited conversions removing the Y 6-inch turret and retaining just the forward Mk 23 turret, but she was eventually sold, arriving at the Inverkeithing yard of Thos. W. Ward on 17 October 1962 to be scrapped. Her three 6-inch triple turrets had been removed to reduce top weight for the largely empty hull for the tow from Chatham to the east coast of Scotland.

Notes

References

Publications

External links

WWII cruisers
HMS Swiftsure at Uboat.net

 

Minotaur-class cruisers (1943)
Ships built on the River Tyne
1943 ships
World War II cruisers of the United Kingdom
Cold War cruisers of the United Kingdom
Ships built by Vickers Armstrong